The Match for Africa series is a recurring set of tennis exhibition matches. They are organized by Swiss player Roger Federer to raise money for the Roger Federer Foundation. In the exhibition, Federer competes in a singles match against another of the world's best tennis players who have also been ranked in the Top 10 by the Association of Tennis Professionals (ATP). Each match has raised over $1,000,000 in support of educational and athletic programs for children in Africa.

The first Match for Africa was held in Federer's native Switzerland against his biggest rival, Rafael Nadal. It was also paired with another charity exhibition match played in Nadal's native Spain and titled Joining Forces for the Benefit of Children. Beginning with the Match for Africa 4, the players have also taken part in a doubles match where they each partner with a celebrity. Federer has partnered with Bill Gates in both such matches. The 2020 edition, contested by Federer and Nadal at the Cape Town Stadium, attracted 51,954 spectators, setting the record for the highest ever attendance at a tennis match.

Match for Africa
"Match for Africa" was a tennis exhibition match played on 21 December 2010. The match was contested between world No. 1 player Rafael Nadal and world No. 2 Roger Federer at the Hallenstadion in Zurich, Switzerland. It was played to benefit the Roger Federer Foundation, which raises money to fund schooling, transport and food for children in Africa. It was the first of two exhibition matches contested by the players in the space of two days, with a match being hosted at the Caja Mágica in Madrid in Nadal's home county, Spain the following day. The match in Madrid was for the benefit of Nadal's foundation, the Fundación Rafa Nadal, and the match was titled "Joining Forces for the Benefit of Children".

Demand for the event at the Hallenstadion was high, with the 10,500 tickets being sold out within minutes of going on sale in September 2010. The match was won by home-favourite Federer in three sets, with a 4–6, 6–3, 6–3 scoreline. The second match in Madrid was won by Nadal 7–6(7–3), 4–6, 6–1.

The matches raised nearly $4 million for charity, with $2.5 million going to the Roger Federer Foundation and $1.3 million to Fundación Rafa Nadal; with more to come in for Nadal's charity as segments of the court were sold from the Madrid match.

Match for Africa 2
"Match for Africa 2" was a second exhibition match to raise money for the Roger Federer Foundation. The match was played on 21 December 2014 in an again sold out Hallenstadion in Zurich, Switzerland. This time the match was contested between the World Number 2 player Roger Federer and World Number 4 Stan Wawrinka. The match was won by Federer 7–6(7–4), 6–4. This exhibition raised £850,000 for education projects in southern Africa.

Match for Africa 3
"Match for Africa 3" was a third exhibition match to raise money for the Roger Federer Foundation. The match was originally planned to be in November 2016, but due to Federer's knee injury it was postponed to 10 April 2017 in Zurich, Switzerland. The match was contested between the world No.4 Roger Federer and world No.1 Andy Murray. The match was won by Federer 6–3, 7–6(8–6). The match raised 1.4 million Suisse francs through the conclusion of the match with another week of donations still to come.

Match for Africa 4
"Match for Africa 4" was a fourth exhibition event to raise money for the Roger Federer Foundation. The matches were played on 29 April 2017 at KeyArena in Seattle, United States. The doubles match was contested between Roger Federer and Bill Gates versus John Isner and Mike McCready of Pearl Jam, and was won by Federer/Gates 6–4. The singles match between Federer and Isner was then contested and it was won by Federer 6–4, 7–6(9–7). The event was sponsored by Microsoft, Nike, Starbucks, and Rolex and raised more than $2,000,000.

Match for Africa 5
Marketed as the "Match for Africa 5: Silicon Valley" was the fifth exhibition event to raise money for the Roger Federer Foundation. The matches were played on 5 March 2018, in San Jose, United States. The doubles were contested between Roger Federer and Bill Gates versus Jack Sock and Savannah Guthrie of NBC News, which were won 6-3 by Gates and Federer. The singles match between Federer and Sock followed, with Federer claiming the victory with 7-6 6–4.

Match in Africa 6
The sixth edition took place on 7 February 2020 in Cape Town, South Africa and featured Roger Federer and Rafael Nadal. Federer confirmed the date, location, and opponent during the 2019 edition of Wimbledon. Federer said he had pursued Nadal's participation for two years before a date as agreed upon. South Africa is the birth country of Federer's mother and the focus of his charitable foundation. The doubles match consisted Roger Federer and Bill Gates versus Rafael Nadal and Trevor Noah, host of The Daily Show. Federer and Gates won the match 6–3. In singles, Federer beat Nadal with the score 6–4, 3–6, 6–3. The event was attended by 51, 954 people (the highest attendance ever recorded at a tennis match) and more than $3.5 million was raised in aid of children's education in Africa.

Results

Singles

Doubles

References

External links
RafaNadal Foundation
Roger Federer Foundation

Exhibition tennis tournaments
Tennis tournaments in Switzerland
Roger Federer
Rafael Nadal
2010 tennis exhibitions
Tennis tournaments in Spain
2010 in Spanish tennis